Ipelegeng is a township west of Schweizer-Reneke in the Mamusa Local Municipality, in the North West Province of South Africa. The total population of the township is about 32,090 people. About 90% of the people in the area are Tswana people. It is located 5 km west of Schweizer-Reneke and 30 km east of Amalia, along the R504.

Details 
Ipelegeng has been divided into sections:

Slovo sections
Extension 4
Extension 5
Extension 6
Extension 8
Extension 9
Number 2
Kathrada
Charon
600
Makhala
Extension 7
Crossroads
3 Rooms
New Stance
New Town
Indian Centre 
Loans

The oldest block in the township is number 2 or 2 kasi. Ipelegeng has three high schools, those being: Ipelegeng Secondary school, Itshupeng Secondary School, and Reabetswe Secondary School. As well as five primary schools: Kolong Primary, Mamusa Primary, Tshwaraganelo Primary, Charon Primary, and Kgatontle Primary. Ipelegeng is known as a quiet township in between Amalia and Schweizer-Reneke.

Education
The township has Public Secondary Schools:

Ipelegeng High School
Itshupeng Secondary School
Reabetswe Secondary School

It also has Public primary schools:

Kolong Primary School
Ikgomotseng Primary School
Kgatontle Primary School
Tshwaraganelo Primary School
Mamusa Primary School
Charon Primary School
Roshunville Primary School

Additional Schools
Hoërskool Schweizer-Reneke
Laerskool Schweizer-Reneke

Townships in North West (South African province)